Jamy  (German Jamm) is a village in the administrative district of Gmina Gorzów Śląski, within Olesno County, Opole Voivodeship, in south-western Poland.

In village is an old wooden church.

References

Jamy